The Eyemo is a 35 mm motion picture film camera which was manufactured by the Bell & Howell Co. of Chicago.

Background
Designed and first manufactured in 1925, it was for many years the most compact 35 mm motion picture film camera, having a 100-foot film capacity. Its small size and ruggedness made it a favorite choice for newsreel and combat cameramen (it was used throughout World War II and the Vietnam War, the War Department providing special manuals for it), and also found use for fiction and documentary filmmakers whenever a portable, rugged, and inconspicuous camera was needed.

The Eyemo is still in use by some filmmakers. It is often used these days as a "crash-cam" for filming dangerous stunts and explosions, and shots in which the camera must be dropped from a building or other elevation.

Construction

The Eyemo is a non-reflex camera: viewing while filming is through an optical viewfinder incorporated into the camera lid. Some models take one lens only. In 1929 there was the first three-port Eyemo, while the "spider model" features a rotating three-lens turret and a "focusing viewfinder" on the side opposite the optical viewfinder. Eyemos feature a 1½" diameter lens mount except the 71-k model, which is slightly different.

Eyemos feature a built-in clockwork (spring wind) motor which, when wound by a ratchet key, can shoot about 20 seconds of film per winding at standard 24 fps (frames per second) speed, and also runs at speeds of four through 64 fps, depending on the model. The camera can be hand-cranked with a manual crank accessory. Several optional electric motors are available; some use DC battery power while others use household AC current. There is currently a synchronized motor available for sync sound filming, but no commercially available camera blimp to reduce the camera's noise.

The Eyemo takes an internal load of 100 feet (30,5 m) of film, which lasts for slightly over one minute when filming at 24 fps. Some models also accept a 400 ft or 1000 ft magazine that is attached to the back, and can hold 4⅓ and 11 minutes of film respectively. When used with a 400 ft magazine, the Eyemo is cumbersome (but not impossible) to operate without the use of a tripod, while the use of a 1000-ft magazine requires tripod support.

Some camera shops have modified Eyemos for reflex viewing, attached video taps and motors to them, and modified the proprietary lens mount to allow the camera to use different optics (such as lenses made for still Nikon cameras).

Bell & Howell also built the successful 16 mm "Filmo" which became first available at the end of 1923. In the 1930s, this camera was marketed as a 'semi professional' camera while the Filmo 127 was introduced as an amateur camera using 8 mm film.

Notable uses
 With the Marines at Tarawa (1944) – shot by Marine Staff Sergeant Norman Hatch during the Battle of Tarawa
 Day of the Fight (1951) –  short shot by Stanley Kubrick on a rented Eyemo
 Psycho (1960) – Multiple cameras used to film shower scene
 Wuthering Heights (2011) – shot by Robbie Ryan

See also 
 Aeroscope
 Konvas
 Filmo
 Debrie Parvo

References

External links

 Eyemo Operating and Repair Manuals
 Eyemo Page
 Eyemo Rental
 Wartime Eyemo, National Museum of Australia
 History of Bell & Howell Eyemo camera

Movie cameras